Gouves is a commune in the Pas-de-Calais department in the Hauts-de-France region of France.

Geography

Population

Places of interest
 The church (and the fountain) of St.Maclou, dating from the nineteenth century.
 Traces of an old castle.

See also
Communes of the Pas-de-Calais department

References

External links

 Website of the “Entente Gouvoise” 

Communes of Pas-de-Calais